Oliver Winery is the largest and oldest winery in the U.S. state of Indiana. It operates in Monroe County north of  Bloomington at 8024 N. State Road 37. Oliver Winery also offers special event spaces available for personal or corporate celebrations, from rehearsal dinners to holiday receptions.

History
Professor William Oliver, a law instructor at Indiana University, moved to Bloomington in 1959 with his wife and children and began making wine in his home from grapes purchased at an Ohio vineyard. Oliver Winery opened in the spring of 1972 and reached an annual production of 38,000 gallons by 1978. It was in 1972 that the winery also began making Camelot Mead, which generated increasing sales. William Oliver was an integral part to the creation and passing of the Small Winery Act of 1971 in Indiana which permitted direct sale of wine to the public not through distribution channels.

Oliver's first tasting room was opened to the public in 1973 where William's wife Mary worked alongside a few other employees.

William's son Bill assumed the management of the winery in 1983 and introduced the use of grapes from outside Indiana in Oliver wines in 1988.  Annual production exceeded 100,000 gallons by the late 1990s, and the winery expects to produce 500,000 to 600,000 gallons in 2007.

Oliver Winery established the Creekbend Vineyard label in 2004.

Competitions

Oliver winery brought home two Concordance Gold medals for their Blackberry and Viognier wines in the 2007 Indy International Wine Competition.

Notes

External links
Oliver Winery website
Wineries of Indiana: Oliver Winery
Video documentary about Oliver's winemaking process 
 Indiana Wine Competition website

Monroe County, Indiana
Wineries in Indiana
1972 establishments in Indiana